The 2019 Volta ao Algarve is a road cycling stage race that took place in the Algarve region of Portugal between 20 and 24 February 2019. It was the 45th edition of the Volta ao Algarve and was rated as a 2.HC event as part of the UCI Europe Tour.

Teams
Twenty-four teams started the race. Each team had a maximum of seven riders:

Route

Stages

Stage 1

Stage 2

Stage 3

Stage 4

Stage 5

Final classifications

References

External links

 

2019 UCI Europe Tour
2019 in Portuguese sport
2019
Volta ao Algarve